The Army Navy Match is the annual rugby union match played between the senior XV teams of the Royal Navy and British Army. It marks the culmination of the annual Inter-Services Competition. Although a match was played between the officers of the British Army and the officers of the Royal Navy at The Oval, London on 13 February 1878, it was not until 1907 that the Army Navy Match became an annual fixture.  For the first fixture the match Secretary was Surg Lt George Levick RN. From 1909 it was jointly administered by the newly formed Royal Navy Rugby Union (RNRU – 1907)  and the Army Rugby Union (ARU – 1906). Since then it has been played every season, with the exception of during the world wars (1914–19 and 1940–45) and COVID-19 pandemic when the matches were suspended.

Brief Background
Traditionally the Army Navy match has been played in the second half of the domestic season but in season 1907/1908 it was played in December and due to this anomaly the calendar year 1908 did not see an Army Navy match played yet they played each other twice in 1907.

The 2016 Army Navy was the 99th in the series and the match saw another new record crowd of 81323 watch the Army Navy match which was one of the most compelling ever.  The Navy took the lead 7–0 (Dave Fairbrother) on 20 minutes before the Army scored three tries (Semesa Rokoduguni 2, Owain Davies)  before half time to lead 19–7 at the beak.  A further try for the Army (James Farrell) early in the second period saw them extend their lead to 26-7 with half an hour of the match remaining.  The Royal Navy staged the most remarkable of comebacks with tries from Gareth Rees and Rhys Dymmock-Williams either side of a penalty try to level the scores at 26-26 with 9 minutes remaining.  An Owain Davies penalty with 2 minutes to go seemed to seal the win for the Army before Royal Navy fullback landed a 45m penalty of his own to again tie the game 29–29 with less than a minute to go.  The draw meant that the Army Navy Trophy was shared but he Royal Navy were Inter Service Champions having beaten the RAF 9–8 at USSG Portsmouth.  The RAF had beaten the Army 13–12 at RAF Halton in the opening round of the Inter Services. Royal Navy Number 8 completed a remarkable game which included a try, a yellow card and being named Man of the Match.

The 2017 Army Navy match was unable to live up to the onfield excitement from the year before.  However the 100th match saw another record crowd (81577), the attendance of Prince Harry as Patron of the Match Charity, Invictus Games Foundation, and an Army win 29-20.

The 101st Army Navy Match was played at Twickenham on 5 May 2018 with the Army winning 22-14. The match was notable in that the Navy had one man sent off in the first ten minutes of the game and the Army took advantage of their wing overlap to good effect. Army Corporal Matthew Dawson was awarded the Babcock Man of the Match.

The First Army Navy game 1878 
The first Army vs Navy game was held on 13 February 1878. A contemporary newspaper The Broad Arrow gave the following account of the match:

A fine exhibition of football delighted the somewhat small number of spectators. Bush scored the first try for the Navy from a scrummage near the line. The goal was kicked by Orford. A band of naval spectators who had taken up their position beneath a white ensign mounted on the roof of a drag greeted this score with great cheering. The greasy state of the ground was not favourable for any great display of running. Encouraged by a cry from their supporters 'Come on Navy, Force the Passage of the Straights' the Navy mounted great pressure and scored a touch down. In the second half the Navy scored a second try. Wrench of the Army took advantage of some bad passing by the Navy and scored the Army try: The goal was kicked but this ended the scoring and the Navy deservedly won the first match between the Services.
The full version of the report from the Broad Arrow seems to suggest that the correct quote of 'Force the Passage of the Straits' was used.

The Army selectors made a generous contribution towards the Navy victory by selecting a Royal Artillery officer, R Bannatyne, as Team Captain. He was serving overseas at the time and received no notification of his selection. As a result, he was absent for the game. The situation was further confounded by the fact that another Army player arrived late and missed a good part of the match.

The teams were:

The First "Official" Army Navy game 1907 
The Army Rugby Union was formed in 1906 whilst the exact date of formation of the Royal Navy Rugby Union is shrouded in doubt but is likely to have been towards the end of 1907, after the 1st official Army v Navy Match.  February 1907 was when the first match organised by the two Services in a formal manner was played, with Surg Lt George Levick RN acting as the Match Secretary.  The match was held at the Queen's Club, West Kensington and was won by the Officers of the Royal Navy 15-14. The match was played at Queen's Club until 1914.  After the First World War the first match was hosted by Twickenham in 1920 and the game has been played there ever since.

Team colours 
Navy - Navy blue shorts, socks and shirt.

Army - White shorts, red shirt and socks.

In the first match of 1878 the Army played in white.  The Navy have always played in blue jerseys though in 1955 their shorts were white.

Anniversary Army Navy Matches 
The first eight matches were played at Queen's Club.  Currently the 101 matches have resulted in 62 Army wins, 35 Navy wins and 4 draws which includes the thrilling 29-29 draw in 2016.  The Royal Navy won the first match in 1907 but the Army have won the other anniversary matches.  On 7 March 1936 the Army won the 25th match 12-3, in 1967 they won the 50th match 6-3, in 1992 they won the 75th match 16-9 and in 2017 they won the 100th match 29-20

Match Results

Pre Inter-Services Championship and Pre ArmyRugby Union / Roya Navy Rugby Union  - Army Navy Matches (1878–1906) 

It is quite probable that other matches were played in this time for which records are not known.

Pre Inter-Services Championship and Post ArmyRugby Union / Roya Navy Rugby Union  - Official Army Navy Matches (1907–1914) 

 The first match that was an official Army Navy Match was in 1907 after the Army Rugby Union had formed in 1906 and with the Royal Navy moving towards formation.  The match Secretary was Surg Lt George Levick and there was a charge for entry. The matches in 1878, 1880, 1905  and 1906 do not count towards the official record of matches between the  two sides with February 1907 being the first and the 29 April 2017 the 100th match.

Men's Inter-Services Championship (1920 to present day) 

In 1920 a Tri-Service competition was created to include the newly formed Royal Air Force (RAF). However, the great rivalry between the Army and Navy has continued and their match, now held at the home of the English Rugby Football Union (Twickenham Stadium), remains the highlight of the annual inter-services rugby competition.

Men's Yearly Results 

Army victories are shown in ██ red, Royal Navy victories in ██ navy, Royal Air Force victories in ██ light blue.
Tied games and tied seasons are shown in ██ white.

2010 & 2020 are the only occasions that an Inter Service match has not taken place for a reason apart from World War.  The RAF v Army match was cancelled as the Army were stranded in their overseas training camp in South Africa due to flight disruptions caused by the 2010 eruptions of Eyjafjallajökull.  In 2020 all three Inter Service matches were cancelled due to restrictions placed on sport by Covid-19

Women's Inter-Services Championship (2003–) 

Since 2003 the women from the three Armed Services have been fielding their own rugby teams and have been competing in an annual inter-service competition.  Prior to this the Royal Air Force Women had played the Royal Navy in 2002, winning 18-5.  In 2019 the Royal Air Force won their first Inter Service title ending the Army's 32 match unbeaten run.  In 2022 the match was moved to Twickenham Stadium, home of England Rugby, and played ass a double header alongside the men.  It was the first time that both Senior XV's of each Union had played the Army v Navy Match in the same venue.

Women's Yearly Results 

Army victories are shown in ██ red, Royal Navy victories in ██ navy, Royal Air Force victories in ██ light blue.
Tied games and tied seasons are shown in ██ white.

References

 McLaren Col Lt J:The History of Army Rugby (Aldershot, The Army RFU, 1986)

External links
 Army Navy Match Official website  
 Army Rugby Union ARU - official website  
 Royal Navy Rugby Union RNRU - official website
 Royal Air Force Rugby Union RAFRU - official website
 Navy Rugby by Alligin Photography Un Official website with largest online resource of Navy Rugby information

Rugby union competitions in England
Recurring sporting events established in 1878